The discography of Benny Tipene, a New Zealand singer-songwriter, contains one studio album, one EP, eight singles, four music videos, six demo releases and one demo compilation.

Tipene's debut single "Make You Mine" was No.9 in Recorded Music NZ's 2013 year-end chart of singles by New Zealand artists. He also had three singles feature in the 2014 year-end chart: "Make You Mine" (No.8), "Lonely" (No.11) and "Step on Up" (No.12). In the year-end chart of albums by New Zealand artists, Tipene's EP Toulouse was No.9.

Albums

Studio albums

Extended plays

Singles

As lead artist

As featured artist

Other appearances

Demos

Music videos

Notes

References 

Tipene, Benny
Tipene, Benny